Thomas McGovern (April 10, 1832—July 25, 1898) was an American prelate of the Roman Catholic Church who served as the second bishop of the Diocese of Harrisburg, Pennsylvania from 1888 until his death in 1898.

Biography

Early life 
McGovern was born on April 10, 1832, in the townland of Drumbar (Kinawley), Swanlinbar, County Cavan in Ireland.  His family immigrated to the United States in 1833, settling in Albany Township, Pennsylvania. 

In 1855, McGovern entered Mount St. Mary's College in Emmitsburg, Maryland, where he earned a Bachelor of Arts degree. He completed his theological studies at St. Charles Borromeo Seminary in Philadelphia.

Priesthood 
McGovern was ordained a priest by Bishop James Wood on December 27, 1861.After serving parishes at Pottstown and Douglassville, Pennsylvania, he was named a curate at St. Michael's Parish and later St. Philip's Parish in Philadelphia. He was pastor of a parish in Bellefonte, Pennsylvania, from 1864 until 1870, when he was transferred to St. Patrick's Parish in York, Pennsylvania. In 1873, McGovern was appointed to a parish in Danville, Pennsylvania. From 1881 to 1882, he went to Europe, Africa and Asia to regain his health.

Bishop of Harrisburg 
On December 6, 1887, McGovern was appointed bishop of the Diocese of Harrisburg by Pope Leo XIII. He received his episcopal consecration on March 11, 1888, from Bishop William O'Hara, with Bishops Richard Gilmour and John Watterson serving as co-consecrators. During his tenure, he erected twelve parishes, mostly designated for the various ethnic groups. 

Thomas McGovern died on July 25, 1898 at age 66.

References

1832 births
1898 deaths
People from County Cavan
Irish emigrants to the United States (before 1923)
Mount St. Mary's University alumni
St. Charles Borromeo Seminary alumni
Roman Catholic bishops of Harrisburg
19th-century Roman Catholic bishops in the United States
Catholic Church in Pennsylvania